Albert W. Price Sr. (September 8, 1917 – November 7, 2011) was an American professional basketball player. He played for the Harlem Globetrotters for five years. He also played for the Toledo Jim White Chevrolets in the National Basketball League during the 1942–43 season and averaged 2.7 points per game.

His older brother, Bernie Price, also played for the Globetrotters and in the NBL.

References

External links
Al Price obituary - The Toledo Blade

1917 births
2011 deaths
American men's basketball players
Basketball players from Ohio
Guards (basketball)
Harlem Globetrotters players
Sportspeople from Toledo, Ohio
Toledo Jim White Chevrolets players
Basketball players from Detroit